Marce Lacouture is an American folk music and cajun recording artist and song writer.

Lacouture grew up in Texas and Louisiana.

She began singing professionally in Austin folk and rock bands and in 1984 formed a duo with Butch Hancock, with whom she recorded two albums. She has spent many years in Louisiana exploring the Cajun heritage, which led her to a long apprenticeship with traditional Louisiana French ballad singers Lula Landry and Inez Catalon, honored on her CD La Joie Cadienne.

One of her songs, "So I'll Run" is featured in the book 31 Songs by British author Nick Hornby, telling about songs and the particular emotional resonance they carry for him.  Hornby had heard LaCouture playing in a bar in north London.

On June 23, 2010, LaCouture performed in the Homegrown Concert Series at the Library of Congress.

Discography 

The Nouveau String Band with Marce Lacouture
Nouveau String Band (2006)

As Marce Lacouture
La Joie Cadienne, Cut Up Records (2004, originally released in 2000)

Rue La-La
Sky on Blue, Riverwheel Records (2000)

With Butch Hancock 
Cause of the Cactus, Rainlight Records (1986, released on cassette only)

With Butch Hancock
Yella Rose, Rainlight Records (1985, previously released on vinyl)

Compilations 
Medicine Show Vols. 3 & 4 (2004)
Louisiana Crossroads – Acadiana Arts Council (2002)
Maritimes des Terres francaise d' Amerique Le Chasse-Marée/Armen-Radio – Canada-chaîne culturelle (2001)
Putumayo Presents Cajun – Putumayo World Records (2001)
Kerrville Folk Festival – Kerrville Folk Foundation (1988)
Live at the Continental Club – (1986)
Kerrville Folk Festival Compilation – Kerrville Folk Foundation (1986)

Also several guest sessions with Sonny Landreth, John Dubois, and Bill Oliver

References

External links
 
 
 Webcast of the American Folklife Center's 2010 Homegrown Concert Series in Washington, D.C. that includes LaCouture discussing and singing some of the traditional songs taught to her by mentors

American country singer-songwriters
Singer-songwriters from Texas
Living people
Year of birth missing (living people)
Country musicians from Texas